The Second Hundred Years is an American sitcom by Screen Gems starring Monte Markham, Arthur O'Connell, and Frank Maxwell, which aired on the ABC television network for one season from September 6, 1967 to September 19, 1968.

Synopsis
In 1900 Luke Carpenter left his wife and infant son to take part in the Alaskan gold rush, but soon after his arrival was buried in a glacial avalanche.  His burial was evidently so complete and so rapid that he survived in a state of suspended animation for 67 years. He was then thawed out and brought to the home of his now-elderly son, Edwin (Arthur O'Connell), who lives in Woodland Oaks, California. Though Luke was 101 years old he looked to be the same age of his 33-year-old grandson, Ken. 

In the pilot episode, a heavily bandaged Luke awakens in Edwin's house and thinks Edwin is a gold robber. After removing his bandages, a bearded Luke dons his prospector's outfit and grabs his rifle in an attempt to find the sheriff to report the robber, but accidentally turns on a TV, which is playing a western. Luke comments "There's a midget in a box challenging me to a duel" and attacks the TV set. Outdoors, Luke, thinking he is in turn-of-the-century Fairbanks, is confused and scared by automobiles, as well as people's strange fashions. Accidentally pointing a rifle at a woman gets the attention of the police, who return him to Edwin. Starting to grasp what has happened, Luke decides to assimilate to 1967 California by shaving off his beard and wearing more modern clothes, which makes him look very much like his grandson Ken (also played by Markham). After some confusion, Luke decides it is best not to burden his family and strikes out on his own by taking a train to San Francisco, but is stopped by Edwin, who convinces his father to live with him and they will take a flight to San Francisco in order to help show that Luke has been given a unique gift, a chance to see the fruits of his generation's sacrifices through the advances of the latter 20th Century. The Army officer who oversaw Luke's unfreezing holds Luke, Edwin and Ken to a state secrecy act, as the Army does not wish for this to be public until the medical corps can fully comprehend why Luke survived. When told the order came from the top, Luke responds "if President McKinley says so it is good enough for me!"

The humor centered around how Luke was younger, both in appearance and attitude, than both his son, who was 67 (referenced in the pilot), but also his grandson Ken, who at 33 was the exact age at which Luke had disappeared and been preserved, and who was a near double for his grandfather (not surprising, as both characters were portrayed by Markham). Difficulty adjusting to all of the technology of the modern era aside, Luke, who was an affable, light-hearted sort, was in some ways more at home in his new world than Edwin. Other times it would play on how both men had buttoned-down ways, but how Luke is treated differently than Edwin for it, such as when Luke considers remarrying and courts a young woman by taking her out on a date in a horse and buggy, to which he is treated as an old-fashioned romantic.

Cast
Monte Markham as Luke and Ken Carpenter
Arthur O'Connell as Edwin Carpenter
Frank Maxwell as Col. Garroway

Reception
The series drew overwhelmingly negative reviews, but premiered with strong ratings. By October, however, the series dropped to the bottom 25. In March 1968, the series was moved to Thursday nights (replacing Batman) but was canceled by ABC a little more than a week later.

Episode list

References

External links
 
 

American Broadcasting Company original programming
1960s American comic science fiction television series
1960s American sitcoms
1967 American television series debuts
1968 American television series endings
Television series about families
Television series by Screen Gems
Television series by Sony Pictures Television
Television shows set in California
Fiction set in 1900
Television series set in the 1900s
Television series set in 1967